Joris Gabriel Djüëla Kenon (born 29 January 1998) is a New Caledonian footballer who plays as a midfielder for French Championnat National 3 club Cognac and the New Caledonia national team.

Club career
Kenon started his career with Laval B.

International career
In February 2022, Kenon was named in the New Caledonia team for 2022 FIFA World Cup qualification matches.

Career statistics

International

References

External links
 
 Joris Kenon at Oceania Football Center

1998 births
Living people
Association football midfielders
New Caledonian footballers
New Caledonia international footballers
Championnat National 3 players